Jamila Rowser is an American writer and publisher. She created the blog Girl Gone Geek (2010–2016), which was devoted to "nerd culture" topics like cosplay, video games, and anime. Rowser founded Black Josei Press as a publishing platform for Black and Brown women comic writers, and published her first comic book, Wash Day, under the press in 2018.

Early life and education 
Rowser's mother was in the Air Force, which required their family move around frequently. Rowser was born in England, and lived for short periods in several locales including the Netherlands, Germany, Hawaii, California, and New York. Her father was a teacher. She is Afro-Latina, and of Black, Dominican, and Puerto Rican descent.

She received her bachelor's degree in communication from New York Institute of Technology, after which she moved to Boca Raton to be near her mother in 2016.

Career 
Rowser created the blog Girl Gone Geek in 2010 to discuss her passions like video games, Star Wars, and Doctor Who, because she had few real life friends who were interested in them.

She developed an international meetup group called Geek Girl Brunch with her friends Rachel and Yissel to create a space for women and non-binary people to connect about nerd culture. She also developed Straight Outta Gotham, a Tumblr that examines the intersection of hip hop and geek culture. She runs the site with Jemar Souza.

Rowser created the publishing platform Black Josei Press to publish comics and merchandise by Black and Brown women creatives. She was inspired by josei manga to create the platform because she admires the scope of comics represented within this subtype of manga.

In 2018 Rowser published her debut comic book, Wash Day, under Black Josei Press, the first from the company. The book was illustrated by Robyn Smith and follows a 26-year-old Kimana's Sunday morning hair washing routine. To fundraise for the book, Rowser created a Kickstarter campaign with a $5,000 goal that eventually exceeded $16,000 in donations by closing. That year she also published Wobbledy 3000, illustrated by Sabii Borno, a sci-fi comic about an extraterrestrial named Latoya who finds twerking difficult.

In 2020, Rowser co-edited Sun and Sand, an anthology of ten comics by South Florida-based artists with Neil Brideau, who approached her to help develop the project to be released on Free Comic Book Day (May 2). She wrote a comic included in the collection, As Above, So Below.

Rowser was hired as a comics outreach consultant at Kickstarter in August 2021. She resigned from the position a few months later in December, citing the company's new blockchain protocol.

Personal life 
Rowser resides in Miami.

Works 

 Wash Day (2018) , Black Josei Press
 Wobbledy 3000 (2018) , Black Josei Press
 As Above, So Below (2020) from Sun and Sand, Black Josei Press
Ode to Keisha (2021) , Black Josei Press

Accolades 
 2018 − Best Comics of 2018, The Comics Journal (for Wash Day)
 2018 − DiNKy award, Floppy Category, Denver Independent Comics & Art (for Wash Day)
2021 − Creative 100 Honoree, Adweek
 2021 − Best Writer, Broken Frontier Awards (for Ode to Keisha)
 2021 − Very Best Comics of 2021, Nerdist (for Ode to Keisha)

References

External links 

 Official website
 Black Josei Press

Year of birth missing (living people)
Living people
American comics writers
Female comics writers
African-American founders
21st-century American women writers
American people of Dominican Republic descent
21st-century Puerto Rican women writers
New York Institute of Technology alumni
Hispanic and Latino American artists
21st-century African-American women writers
21st-century African-American writers